Chrysomphalina chrysophylla is a species of mushroom with a north temperate distribution. Described by Elias Magnus Fries in 1821, it was placed in the genus Chrysomphalina by Swiss mycologist Heinz Clémençon in 1982.

References

External links

Fungi of Europe
Hygrophoraceae
Fungi described in 1821
Taxa named by Elias Magnus Fries